May Irene McAvoy (September 8, 1899 – April 26, 1984) was an American actress who worked mainly during the silent-film era. Some of her major roles are Laura Pennington in The Enchanted Cottage, Esther in Ben-Hur, and Mary Dale in The Jazz Singer.

Life and career
May Irene McAvoy was born on September 8, 1899 in New York City to Julia Agnes McAvoy (née Reilly) and James Patrick McAvoy, who were both first generation Irish-Americans. The 1910 census lists her as living with her maternal grandparents in Sussex, New Jersey. 

McAvoy debuted as an extra in the film Hate in 1917. After appearing in more than three dozen films, she co-starred with Ramón Novarro and Francis X. Bushman in director Fred Niblo's 1925 production of Ben-Hur released by MGM. She also portrayed Lady Windermere in Ernst Lubitsch's Lady Windermere's Fan (1925).

In addition to acting in The Jazz Singer, McAvoy coached Al Jolson as he made his film debut. Although her voice was not heard in The Jazz Singer, she spoke in several other films, including the second sound film released by Warner Brothers, The Terror, which was directed by Roy Del Ruth and co-starred Conrad Nagel.

For years, a rumor circulated that McAvoy retired from the screen at the transition to sound films because of a lisp or speech impediment. In truth, she married the treasurer of United Artists, who asked her not to work.

Later, she returned to films and played small, uncredited roles during the 1940s and 1950s, making her final film appearance in a small part of the 1959 version of Ben-Hur. Most of her later uncredited work was performed for MGM.

McAvoy was the Rose Queen in the Rose Parade in 1923.

Personal life
McAvoy married banker Maurice Cleary on June 26, 1929, with whom she had a son named Patrick, and divorced him in 1940. They remarried on December 10, 1971. She was a registered Republican. McAvoy was a lifelong Roman Catholic.

Death
On April 26, 1984, McAvoy died at the age of 84 from the after effects of a heart attack suffered the previous year. She is interred in the Holy Cross Cemetery in Culver City, California.

For her contribution to the motion picture industry, May McAvoy has a star on the Hollywood Walk of Fame at 1731 Vine Street.

Filmography
Silent

 Hate (1917) as May Garvan
 To Hell with the Kaiser! (1918) (*lost) as Wounded Girl
 A Perfect Lady (1918) as Claire Higgins
 I'll Say So (1918) as Minor Role (uncredited)
 Mrs. Wiggs of the Cabbage Patch (1919) (*extant) as Australy Wiggs
 The Woman Under Oath (1919) (*extant) as Edith Norton
 Love Wins (1919)
 The Way of a Woman (1919) (*extant) as Grace Lee
 My Husband's Other Wife (1920) as Nettie Bryson
 The Sporting Duchess (1920) (*lost) as Mary Aylmer
 Man and His Woman (1920) as Eve Cartier
 The House of the Tolling Bell (1920) as Lucy Atheron
 The Forbidden Valley (1920) as Morning Glory
 The Devil's Garden (1920) (*lost) as Norah
 The Truth About Husbands (1920) (*extant; Library of Congress)
 Sentimental Tommy (1921, Paramount) (*lost) as Grizel
 A Private Scandal (1921) as Jeanne Millett
 Everything for Sale (1921) as Helen Wainwright
 Morals (1921) (*extant) as Carlotta
 A Virginia Courtship (1921) (*lost) as Prudence Fairfax
 A Homespun Vamp (1922) (*lost) as Meg Mackenzie
 Through a Glass Window (1922) as Jenny Martin
 The Top of New York (1922) (*lost) as Hilda O'Shaunnessey
 A Trip to Paramountown (1922, Short) (*extant) as Herself
 Clarence (1922, Paramount) (*lost) as Cora Wheeler
 Kick In (1922, Paramount) (*extant) as Myrtle
 Grumpy (1923, Paramount) (*extant) as Virginia Bullivant
 Only 38 (1923 Paramount) (*lost) as Lucy Stanley
 Her Reputation (1923, Ince / Associated First National) (*lost) as Jacqueline Lanier
 Hollywood (1923, Paramount) as Herself (*lost)
 West of the Water Tower (1923, Paramount) (*lost) as Bee Chew
 The Enchanted Cottage (1924, Asso.FirstNational) (*extant; Library of Congress) as Laura Pennington
 The Bedroom Window (1924, Paramount) (*extant; Library of Congress) as Ruth Martin
 Tarnish (1924, Goldwyn) (*lost) as Letitia Tevis
 Three Women (1924, Warner Brothers) (*extant) as Jeannie Wilton
 Married Flirts (1924, Goldwyn) (*lost) as Herself, Guest at party
 The Mad Whirl (1925, Universal) (*extant; Library of Congress) as Cathleen Gillis
 Tessie (1925, ArrowFilm) (*lost) as Tessie
 Ben-Hur (1925, MGM) (*extant) as Esther
 Lady Windermere's Fan (1925, Warner Brothers) (*extant) as Lady Windermere
 Calf-Love (1926, Short)
 The Road to Glory (1926, Fox) (*lost) as Judith Allen
 My Old Dutch (1926, Universal) (*extant) as Sal Gratton
 The Passionate Quest (1926, Warner Brothers) (*lost; fragment Library of Congress) as Rosina Vonet
 The Savage (1926, First National) (*lost) as Ysabel Atwater
 The Fire Brigade (1926, MGM) (*extant) as Helen Corwin
 Matinee Ladies (1927, Warner Brothers) (*lost) as Sallie Smith
 Irish Hearts (1927, Warner Brothers) (*lost) as Sheila

Sound

 Slightly Used (1927 Vitaphone / Warner Brothers) (*lost; first of McAvoy's films with Vitaphone track of effects and music) as Cynthia Martin
 The Jazz Singer (1927 Vitaphone / Warner Brothers) (*extant) as Mary Dale
 A Reno Divorce (1927 Vitaphone / Warner Brothers) (*lost) as Carla
 If I Were Single (1927 Vitaphone / Warner Brothers) as May Howard
 The Little Snob (1928 Vitaphone / Warner Brothers) as May Banks
 Sunny California (1928, Short)
 The Lion and the Mouse (1928 Vitaphone / WarnerBrothers) (*extant) as Shirley Ross
 Caught in the Fog (1928 Vitaphone / Warner Brothers) (*extant; 35mm British Film Institute) The Girl
 The Terror (1928 Vitaphone / Warner Brothers) (*extant) as Olga Redmayne
 Stolen Kisses (1929 Vitaphone / Warner Brothers) (*lost) as May Lambert
 No Defense (1929 Vitaphone / Warner Brothers) (*lost) as Ruth Harper
 Two Girls on Broadway (1940) as Chatworth's Secretary (uncredited)
 The New Pupil (1940, Short) as Sally's mother
 The Phantom Raiders (1940) as Middle Telephone Operator (uncredited)
 Dulcy (1940) as Miss Murphy - Van Dyke's Secretary (uncredited)
 Third Finger, Left Hand (1940) as Telephone Operator (uncredited)
 Whispers (1941, Short) as Gossip (uncredited)
 1-2-3 Go! (1941, Short) as Miss Jones, nurse
 Love Crazy (1941) as Sanity Hearing Secretary (uncredited)
 The Getaway (1941) as Duff's Secretary (uncredited)
 Ringside Maisie (1941) as 1st Nurse (uncredited)
 Main Street on the March! (1941, Short) as Window Shopper (uncredited)
 Born to Sing (1942) (uncredited)
 Mr. Blabbermouth! (1942, Short) as Wife (uncredited)
 Assignment in Brittany (1943) as Nurse (uncredited)
 My Tomato (1943, Short) as Gidge's Customer (uncredited)
 Two Girls and a Sailor (1944) as Dowager (uncredited)
 Movie Pests (1944, *short) as Woman Whose Vision Gets Blocked (uncredited)
 Barbary Coast Gent (1944) (scenes deleted)
 Week-End at the Waldorf (1945) (uncredited)
 Till the Clouds Roll By (1946) as Well-Wisher after Roberta (uncredited)
 The Romance of Rosy Ridge (1947) as Wife (uncredited)
 The Unfinished Dance (1947) as Ronsell's Secretary (uncredited)
 A Date with Judy (1948) as Dance Attendee (uncredited)
 Luxury Liner (1948) as Woman (uncredited)
 The Yellow Cab Man (1950) as (uncredited)
 Mystery Street (1950) as Nurse (uncredited)
 Watch the Birdie (1950) (uncredited)
 The Bad and the Beautiful (1952) as Pebbel's Secretary (uncredited)
 Executive Suite (1954) as Grimm's Secretary (uncredited)
 The Tender Trap (1955) as Visitor to Home Show (uncredited)
 Ransom! (1956) as Miss May (uncredited)
 The Wings of Eagles (1957) as Nurse (uncredited)
 Designing Woman (1957) as Boston Wardrobe Woman (uncredited)
 Gun Glory (1957) as Woman (uncredited)
 Jailhouse Rock (1957) (uncredited)
 Ben-Hur (1959) as Woman in Crowd (uncredited) (final film role)

References

External links

Photography and bibliography
May McAvoy portrait gallery NY Public Library (Billy Rose collection)

1899 births
1984 deaths
Actresses from New York City
American film actresses
American silent film actresses
Burials at Holy Cross Cemetery, Culver City
20th-century American actresses
American Roman Catholics
New York (state) Republicans
California Republicans